Padadaya (The Outcast) is a 1999 Sri Lankan Sinhala drama film directed and produced by Linton Semage for Hiru Films. It stars Linton Semage and Shyamali Warusavitana in lead roles along with Saumya Liyanage and Trilicia Gunawardena. Music composed by Rohana Weerasinghe. It is the 911th Sri Lankan film in the Sinhala cinema. The film received mostly positive reviews from critics.

The film won a Special Jury Award Dhaka International Film Festival held on 28 January 2000. It also shared the NETPAC Award for the Best Asian Film with fellow Sri Lankan film Saroja directed by Somaratne Dissanayake. The film represented Sri Lanka in competitive sections of Kerala, Mumbai, Oslo, Pusan and New Delhi International Film Festivals screened at the competitive section of the Buenos Aires International Film Festival in Argentina as well.

Plot

Cast
 Linton Semage as Dharmadasa
 Shyamalee Varusavithana
 Karu Gunaratne		
 Trilicia Gunawardena		
 Saumya Liyanage as Homeguard
 Hiru Gunawardhana		
 Pradeep Jayathilake		
 Sarath Kothalawala		
 Lal Kularatne		
 G.R Perera		
 Thilak Ranasinghe

Soundtrack

References

2007 films
2000s Sinhala-language films